Headlam is a surname. Notable people with the surname include:

Arthur Headlam (1862–1947), English Anglican bishop
Cecil Headlam (1872–1934), English cricketer and writer
Cuthbert Headlam (1876–1964), British politician
Eustace Headlam (1892–1958), Australian cricketer
Felix Headlam (1897–1965), Australian cricketer
Frank Headlam (1914–1976), Royal Australian Air Force officer 
James Wycliffe Headlam (1863–1929), British historian
Stewart Headlam (1847–1924), English Anglican priest
Thomas Emerson Headlam (1813–1875), English barrister and politician
Walter Headlam (1866–1908), English poet and classical scholar
Wayne Headlam (born 1948), Australian rules footballer

See also
 Headlam, Co. Durham, England